The AFC–OFC Challenge Cup was a football tournament, set up as the successor of the discontinued Afro-Asian Cup of Nations. It was a biannual event, with Oceania represented by the winners of the OFC Nations Cup and Asia alternately by the winners of the AFC Asian Cup and those of the Asian Games. It is staged as a home and away format.

The cup was first played with Japan beating Australia 3–0 in 2001.

Results and statistics

Finals

Most successful national teams

Results by confederation

Editions

2001 AFC–OFC Challenge Cup

2003 AFC–OFC Challenge Cup
The match was originally planned as two-legged tie on March 28 in Auckland and April 4 in Tehran, but then postponed due to Iraq War.

See also
Afro-Asian Cup of Nations
CONMEBOL–UEFA Cup of Champions
Panamerican Championship

References

External links
 RSSSF

Asian Football Confederation competitions for national teams
Oceania Football Confederation competitions
National association football supercups
2001–02 in OFC football
2003–04 in OFC football